Vijay Seonarine (born 14 May 1979) is a Guyanese cricketer. He played in one List A match for Guyana in 1998/99.

See also
 List of Guyanese representative cricketers

References

External links
 

1979 births
Living people
Guyanese cricketers
Guyana cricketers